Le farò da padre (also known as I'll Take Her Like a Father and Bambina) is a 1974 Italian comedy film directed by  Alberto Lattuada.  It is the debut-title of Teresa Ann Savoy. The film was filmed in Apulia.

Cast 
Gigi Proietti as Saverio Mazzacolli
Irene Papas as Raimonda Spina Tommaselli
Teresa Ann Savoy as Clotilde
Mario Scaccia as Don Amilcare de Loyola
Bruno Cirino as Peppe Colizzi
Lina Polito as Concettina
Isa Miranda as Aunt Elisa
Clelia Matania as Aunt Lorè

Plot
The lawyer Mazzacolli (Proietti) wants to get his hands on the properties of a countess (Papas) and, helped by a local nobleman (Scaccia), staged the kidnapping of the countess' mentally-disabled child whose hand he had asked for (Savoy). The move would force the hand of the countess, particularly for granting the usufruct of the property to her future husband. Mazzacolli had not reckon with love, which  unpredictably changes ideas and situations.

References

External links

1970 films
Italian comedy-drama films
1970 comedy-drama films
Films directed by Alberto Lattuada
Commedia all'italiana
Films scored by Fred Bongusto
1970s Italian films